At the 1976 Summer Olympics in Montreal, four diving events were contested during a competition that took place at the Montréal Olympic Pool, from 19 to 27 July (24 July, rest day), comprising 80 divers from 22 nations.

Medal summary
The events are named according to the International Olympic Committee labelling, but they appeared on the official report as "springboard diving" and "platform diving", respectively.

Men

Women

Medal table

Participating nations
Here are listed the nations that were represented in the diving events and, in brackets, the number of national competitors.

See also
 Diving at the 1975 Pan American Games

Notes

References
 
 

 
1976 Summer Olympics events
1976
1976 in water sports